Elena Loewenthal (born 22 January 1960 in Turin) is an Italian historian and translator, specialising in Jewish history, having translated Louis Ginzberg's The Legends of the Jews in its six volumes into Italian under the Adelphi Edizioni publishing house. She was awarded the Grinzane Cavour Prize in 2003.

References 

1960 births
Living people
Italian historians